The 2009–10 Frölunda HC season was the team's 30th season in Elitserien.

Frölunda captured a playoff spot, ending up 7th in the regular season. The team met Linköpings HC in the quarterfinals, where they led the series 3–1. However, Linköping won the three following games and thus Frölunda were knocked out of the playoffs.

Pre-season

Nordic Trophy

Game log

Exhibition games

Game log

Regular season

Standings

Game log

Playoffs

Quarterfinal vs. (4) Linköpings HC

Statistics

Skaters

Goaltenders

Transactions

Drafted players

Frölunda HC players picked in the 2010 NHL Entry Draft at the Staples Center in Los Angeles.

References

External links
Frolundaindians.com — Official team website
Hockeyligan.se — Official league website
Swehockey.se — Official statistics website

2009-10
2009–10 in Swedish ice hockey